Pepper Money Limited, known as Pepper Money, is a consumer finance company that specialises in consumer lending and residential mortgages. It is part of Pepper Financial Services Group, which has offices in Ireland, Spain, South Korea and the United Kingdom.

History 
Pepper Money was founded in 2000 and is headquartered in Sydney, Australia.  

Between 2006 and 2010 Pepper was operated by Merrill Lynch. In July 2015, Pepper listed on the Australian Securities Exchange (ASX) with a market capitalization of A$470 million, which increased to $600 million in the first day of trading.

Pepper Money was acquired by KKR for $657 million in November 2017 and was delisted from the ASX. In 2017 it partnered with Pollenizer to back SmallStash a fintech start-up that aimed to focus on financial education for kids and assisting parents to better educate their children on money and savings.

On 25 May 2021, Pepper was relisted on the ASX and has around 2000 employees worldwide.

Sponsorship 
Pepper has sponsored the St Kilda Football Club since 2015, and previously sponsored the Western Sydney Wanderers Football Club between 2013 and 2018. 

Pepper Money was the principal sponsor of the Illawarra Hawks NBL team for the 2021 season.

Awards 
In 2019, Pepper won the Best Non-Bank Lender in the annual Australian Lending Awards. In 2021, Pepper won the Best Specialist Lender in the Australian Lending Awards. In 2022, Pepper won Non-Bank of The Year at the Australian Mortgage Awards and was listed as a top-10 innovator on AFR BOSS' Most Innovative Companies list.

References

Asset management
Companies based in Sydney
Companies listed on the Australian Securities Exchange
Kohlberg Kravis Roberts companies
Mortgage lenders
2000 establishments in Australia